A separating arch is an arch, which, as arcade, separates the nave of a church from the side aisle, or an arch between two adjacent side aisles. It is found mainly in hall churches. In this case one speaks - instead of a Scheidbogen - also of a Scheidrippe.

Separating arches as elements of vaults and wall division 
Sheathing arches delimit a bay in the longitudinal direction. With the belt arches as well as the pillars or columns at the four corners, the segmental arches form a vault field as the basic element of a vault.

A wall supported by separating arches is called a separating wall.

References

Further reading 
 Art. Scheidbogen. In , Günther Binding: Bildwörterbuch der Architektur (. Vol. 194). 4th revised edition. Kröner, Stuttgart 2005, .
 Scheidbogen. In Hans-Joachim Kadatz: Wörterbuch der Architektur, Seemann, Leipzig, 2nd edition 1988, .
 Scheidbogen. In Wilfried Koch: Baustilkunde. Europäische Baukunst von der Antike bis zur Gegenwart. Mosaik-Verlag, München 1982, .

Architecture